Onthophagus polyphemi, known generally as the gopher tortoise onthophagus beetle or onthophagus tortoise commensal scarab, is a species of dung beetle in the family Scarabaeidae.

Subspecies
These two subspecies belong to the species Onthophagus polyphemi:
 Onthophagus polyphemi polyphemi Hubbard, 1894
 Onthophagus polyphemi sparsisetosus Howden & Cartwright, 1963

References

Further reading

 

Scarabaeinae
Articles created by Qbugbot
Beetles described in 1894